Metaparody is a form of humor or literary technique consisting "parodying the parody of the original", sometimes to the degree that the viewer is unclear as to which subtext is genuine and which subtext parodic. The American literary critic Gary Saul Morson has written extensively on the topic:

References

Satire
Literary criticism